Macromia viridescens is a species of dragonfly in the family Macromiidae,
known as the rainforest cruiser. 
It is a large, black to metallic green dragonfly with yellow markings on its thorax, dark metallic green on its abdomen, clear wings and long legs.
It is found on Cape York in northern Queensland, Australia, and New Guinea,
where it inhabits streams.

Gallery

See also
 List of Odonata species of Australia

References

Macromiidae
Odonata of Australia
Insects of Australia
Taxa named by Robert John Tillyard
Insects described in 1911